ISO/IEC JTC 1/SC 24 Computer graphics, image processing and environmental data representation is a standardization subcommittee of the joint subcommittee ISO/IEC JTC 1 of the International Organization for Standardization (ISO) and the International Electrotechnical Commission (IEC), which develops and facilitates standards within the field of computer graphics, image processing, and environmental data representation. The international secretariat of ISO/IEC JTC 1/SC 24 is the British Standards Institute (BSI) located in the United Kingdom.

History
ISO/IEC JTC 1/SC 24 was formed in 1987 from ISO/TC 97 as a result of Resolution 21 at the ISO/IEC JTC 1 plenary. The group’s origins began in computer graphics, the standardization of which was originally under ISO/IEC JTC 1/SC 21/WG 2. However, when ISO/IEC JTC 1/SC 24 was created, the standardization activity of ISO/IEC JTC 1/SC 21/WG 2 was carried over to the new subcommittee. The initial five working groups of ISO/IEC JTC 1/SC 24 were titled, “Architecture,” “Application programming interfaces,” “Metafiles and interfaces,” “Language bindings,” and “Validation, testing and registration.” The work of ISO/IEC JTC 1/SC 24 began with the Graphical Kernel System (GKS), which was adopted from ISO/IEC JTC 1/SC 21/WG 2. However, since GKS only addressed 2D functionality, attention turned to the standardization of 3D functionality. This resulted in two standards being published: GKS-3D in 1988 and PHIGS in 1989, both of which addressed 3D functionality. Since 1991, ISO/IEC JTC 1/SC 24 has held plenaries in a number of countries, including the Netherlands, Germany, United States, France, Canada, Japan, Sweden, Korea, United Kingdom, Australia, and Czech Republic.

Scope
The scope of ISO/IEC JTC 1/SC 24 is the “Standardization of interfaces for information technology based applications relating to”:
 Computer graphics
 Image processing
 Environmental data representation
 Support for the Mixed and Augmented Reality (MAR)
 Interaction with, and visual representation of, information
Included are the following related areas:
 Modeling and simulation and related reference models
 Virtual reality with accompanying augmented reality/augmented virtuality aspects and related reference models
 Application program interfaces
 Functional specifications
 Representation models
 Interchange formats, encodings and their specifications, including metafiles
 Device interfaces
 Testing methods
 Registration procedures
 Presentation and support for creation of multimedia, hypermedia, and mixed reality documents
Excluded are the following areas:
 Character and image coding
 Coding of multimedia, hypermedia, and mixed reality document interchange formats
 JTC 1 work in user system interfaces and document presentation
 ISO/TC 207 work on ISO 14000 environment management, ISO/TC 211 work on geographic information and geomatics
 Software environments as described by ISO/IEC JTC 1/SC 22

Structure
ISO/IEC JTC 1/SC 24 is made up of four active working groups, each of which carries out specific tasks in standards development within the field of computer graphics, image processing and environmental data representation, together with ITU-T Study Group 16. As a response to changing standardization needs, working groups of ISO/IEC JTC 1/SC 24 can be disbanded if their area of work is no longer applicable, or established if new working areas arise. The focus of each working group is described in the group’s terms of reference. Active working groups of ISO/IEC JTC 1/SC 24 are:

Collaborations
ISO/IEC JTC 1/SC 24 works in close collaboration with a number of other organizations or subcommittees, both internal and external to ISO or IEC, in order to avoid conflicting or duplicative work. Organizations internal to ISO or IEC that collaborate with or are in liaison to ISO/IEC JTC 1/SC 24 include:
 ISO/IEC JTC 1/WG 7, Sensor Networks
 ISO/IEC JTC 1/SC 29, Coding of audio, picture, multimedia and hypermedia information
 ISO/IEC JTC 1/SC 32, Data management and interchange
 ISO/TAG 14, Imagery and technology
 ISO/TC 130, Graphic Technology
 ISO/TC 184/SC 4, Industrial data
 ISO/TC 211, Geographic information/Geomatics
 ISO/TC 215, Health informatics
 IEC TC 100, Audio, video and multimedia system and equipment

Some organizations external to ISO or IEC that collaborate with or are in liaison to ISO/IEC JTC 1/SC 24 include:
 Defence Geospatial Information Working Group (DGIWG)
 Digital Imaging and Communications in Medicine (DICOM)
 International Hydrographic Organization (IHO)
 The Khronos Group
 NATO - Joint Intelligence Surveillance and Reconnaissance Capability Group (JISRCG)
 OMG Robotics DTF
 Open CGM
 Open Geospatial Consortium (OGC)
 SEDRIS Organization
 Simulation Interoperability Standards Organization (SISO)
 US National Imagery Transmission Format Standard (NITFS) Technical Board (US NTB)
 Web3D Consortium
 World Intellectual Property Organization (WIPO)
 World Wide Web Consortium (W3C)

Member countries
Countries pay a fee to ISO to be members of subcommittees.

The 10 "P" (participating) members of ISO/IEC JTC 1/SC 24 are: Australia, China, Egypt, France, Japan, Republic of Korea, Portugal, Russian Federation, United Kingdom, and United States.

The 23 "O" (observer) members of ISO/IEC JTC 1/SC 24 are: Argentina, Austria, Belgium, Bosnia and Herzegovina, Bulgaria, Canada, Cuba, Czech Republic, Finland, Ghana, Hungary, Iceland, India, Indonesia, Islamic Republic of Iran, Italy, Kazakhstan, Malaysia, Poland, Romania, Serbia, Slovakia, Switzerland, and Thailand.

Published standards
ISO/IEC JTC 1/SC 24 currently has 80 published standards under their direct responsibility within the field of computer graphics, image processing, and environmental data representation, including:

See also
 ISO/IEC JTC 1
 List of ISO standards
 British Standards Institute
 International Organization for Standardization
 International Electrotechnical Commission
 SEDRIS
 X3D

References 

024
GIS software
Computer graphics